Stöger or Stoeger is a surname. Notable people with the surname include:

Alois Stöger (born 1960), Austrian politician
Kevin Stöger (born 1993), Austrian footballer
Pascal Stöger (born 1990), Austrian footballer
Peter Stöger (born 1966), Austrian footballer and manager
William R. Stoeger (1943–2014), American astronomer and theologian